The 1808 United States presidential election in Ohio took place as part of the 1808 United States presidential election. Voters chose three representatives, or electors, to vote for president and vice president.

James Madison, the nominee of the governing Democratic-Republican Party, defeated Federalist Party challenger Charles C. Pinckney and fellow Democratic-Republican James Monroe, who ran as the candidate of the Tertium quids, by 2,471 votes (41.23%). Monroe would later succeed Madison as the fifth president of the United States in 1817.

Results

References 

1808 United States presidential election by state
United States presidential elections in Ohio
1812 Ohio elections